The 2005 1000 km of Spa was the opening race of the 2005 Le Mans Series season and held at Circuit de Spa-Francorchamps, Belgium.  It was run on April 17, 2005

Official results
Class winners in bold.  Cars failing to complete 70% of winner's distance marked as Not Classified (NC).

Statistics
 Pole Position - #17 Pescarolo Sport - 2:21.076
 Fastest Lap - #15 Zytek Engineering - 2:10.270
 Average Speed - 153.129 km/h

External links

 World Sports Racing Prototypes - 2005 1000 km of Spa results

S
6 Hours of Spa-Francorchamps
1000km